Lake El Reno was created in 1966 in Canadian County, Oklahoma, near the city of El Reno, by constructing an earthen dam across Fourmile Creek, (Canadian County, Oklahoma), a tributary of the North Canadian River. The lake is operated by the city of El Reno.

No city fishing permit is needed, but a state permit is required (as is true for fishing anywhere in the state).

See also
Lakes of Oklahoma

Notes

References

External links
OWRB El Reno lake
Lake El Reno

Reservoirs in Oklahoma
Bodies of water of Canadian County, Oklahoma